Post-vaccination follicular eruption is a cutaneous condition that occurs 9 to 11 days following vaccination, and is characterized in multiple follicular, erythematous papules.

See also 
 Skin lesion

References 

Virus-related cutaneous conditions